Music from Another Room is a 1998 American romantic comedy, directed by Charlie Peters and starring Jude Law, Jennifer Tilly, Gretchen Mol, Martha Plimpton, and Brenda Blethyn.

Plot
The story begins at Thanksgiving in 1973, with five-year-old Danny Kowalski (Cory Buck) ringing the doorbell to the Swan's house. Danny is there with his military doctor father to see family friend Grace (Brenda Blethyn) and her family. Grace is expecting her fourth baby, and goes into labor while they are visiting. The baby won't wait for the hospital meaning Danny's father has to deliver it. As the umbilical cord is snagged and as he's been enjoying Thanksgiving wine all day, the father fears he may not be sober enough to reach in and untangle. Danny is asked to use his smaller hands to unwrap the cord from the baby's neck. The girl is born, and Grace names her Anna. Danny is astounded by the whole event and happily announces "I'm going to marry her!"  Everyone chuckles while Grace pensively looks at him.

Because his dad finds new work in England they move away. Twenty-five years later, Danny (Jude Law) moves back to his hometown after his dad's death. He is a mosaic tile restorer hoping to become a master tiler, and is interviewing for a recommended restoration. He finds a modest apartment owned by a bakery shop couple, who also offer him a delivery job until the tile work starts. Getting lost on his first delivery, Danny stops for directions at house with a distinctive swan bell. It is still Grace Swan's house and before he leaves, he sees Nina (Jennifer Tilly) and the Anna (Gretchen Mol) who he helped bring into the world. He then continues to complete the delivery, mystified at the coincidence. He tells his kind baker boss and his wife about the chance reunion, and they fill him in a bit on their story.

Soon, the Swan family order a cake from the bakery and Danny leaves to deliver it, hoping to see Anna. He crashes his bike into a car outside the home and loses consciousness. He wakes up inside the house, meeting Grace and her family. Nina reveals her lifelong blindness and the fears that keep her from a normal life. He meets the brother Billy (Jeremy Piven) and Billy's wife, Irene (Jane Adams) who is distraught over her husband's infidelities and exhibits bizarre behaviors. Danny reacquaints with Anna's father Richard (Bruce Jarchow), her sister Karen (Martha Plimpton) and Anna's boyfriend Eric (Jon Tenney). He is invited to stay for dinner during which he learns of Anna's recent engagement to Eric. They converse about love and when asked what love is like, Danny states it is like hearing music from another room and it being so beautiful that you hum along.

Danny begins his job as a mosaic tiler artist at the local museum. A few days later he is with Anna again and asks her to run away and marry him. Anna rejects him kindly and rides off, with Danny chasing her. He confesses his love for Anna to his coworkers who give him a trick, two-headed coin, instructing him to tell Anna: "Heads you love me, tails I leave you alone." Danny uses it the next time he is alone with Anna, but she claims the right to read the result and calls "tails". 

He is now friends with the family, failing in attempts to help Nina with her self-imposed fears. He sees that Anna's motherly way with her siblings is a bit stifling, and works at helping her lighten her grip. Danny does enjoy some success with Nina, even getting her to go with him to a local dance where she meets Jesus, a young tradesman. By the time it's clear they are a pair, Grace has been ill and is dying. Anna is jealous of the love between Nina and Jesus (Vincent Laresca), and rushes to Danny's home to actualize her passion as well, confessing she lied and that the coin flip read "heads." The two sleep together, then part so Anna may tell her mother about her love for Danny. Irene and Billy have another one of their confrontations, ending in her shooting him in the foot.

Nina and Jesus elope at night and his family and friends celebrate their union. Nina returns home to tell her mother, and Grace is thrilled because she can now die in peace concerning Nina. Later that night, Grace dies in Richard's arms. Anna arrives home to tell her mother about her relationship with Danny only to find that she is too late. At Grace's funeral, Anna tells Danny that she has already told Eric about their affair. Danny tells Anna he is leaving in a couple of days, and says goodbye. He ties up business at the tile site, making something special for the wall and packs, painting over Anna's name he's been having over his bed.  That night, Eric announces he and Anna are going to Paris to get married in a few days. Nina is convinced that this direction for Anna is all wrong. The next day, Nina has Anna meet her on the site of Danny's tile work which turns out to be swans, and carrying a message to Anna. Nina insists that Anna belongs with Danny and advises her to go after him.

First rejecting her sister's viewpoint, Anna is soon inspired by the swan tile work. She rushes to the train station and begs Danny to take her with him, no matter where he is going. Danny says this adventure won't last but Anna holds up a regular coin and says if it lands heads, she will go with him. Tails, she'll leave him alone. Anna flips the coin and Danny puts his foot over it when it lands. Without looking at the coin he then declares it is heads, the two kiss.

Cast
 Jude Law as Danny Kowalski
 Jennifer Tilly as Nina Swan
 Gretchen Mol as Anna Swan
 Martha Plimpton as Karen Swan
 Brenda Blethyn as Grace Swan
 Jon Tenney as Eric
 Jeremy Piven as Billy Swan
 Vincent Laresca as Jesus
 Jane Adams as Irene Swan
 Bruce Jarchow as Richard Swan
 Kevin Kilner as Hank Kowalski
 Jan Rubes as Louis Klammer
 Judith Malina as Clare Klammer
 Jon Polito as Lorenzo Palmieri

Production

Filming
Los Angeles and Pasadena, California and at the Park Plaza Hotel in Los Angeles.

Music
Music from Another Room features on its soundtrack "Truly Madly Deeply" by Savage Garden and the song "Day After Day", written by Julian Lennon and Mark Spiro and performed by Julian Lennon.
In the theatrical test release in Los Angeles' the film originally had U2's "With Or Without You" song as the final credits.

References

External links 
 
 
 
 

1998 romantic comedy films
American romantic comedy films
Films scored by Richard Gibbs
Orion Pictures films
1990s English-language films
1990s American films
Films about disability